Black Sun is a 2007 Italian-French revenge drama film written and directed by Krzysztof Zanussi and starring Valeria Golino. It is  based on the stage drama Agata by Rocco Familiari.

Plot

Cast 

 Valeria Golino as Agata
 Kaspar Capparoni as  Salvo
  Lorenzo Balducci as  Manfredi
  Marco Basile as  Pusher
 Toni Bertorelli as  Inspector  
 Remo Girone as  Anatomopathologist
 Rocco Familiari as  Priest 
  Béatrice Kruger as  Psychologist

References

External links

Italian drama films
French drama films
2007 drama films
2007 films
Italian films about revenge
Films directed by Krzysztof Zanussi
Films scored by Wojciech Kilar
2000s Italian-language films
2000s Italian films
2000s French films